The 1987–88 FIS Cross-Country World Cup was the 7th official World Cup season in cross-country skiing for men and women. The World Cup started in La Clusaz, France, on 12 December 1987 and finished in Rovaniemi, Finland, on 27 March 1988. Gunde Svan of Sweden won the overall men's cup, and Marjo Matikainen of Finland won the women's.

The first ever mass start event in the World Cup was arranged in Kastelruth, Italy on 15 December 1987. Swede Torgny Mogren won the men's 30 km race. The first women's mass start event was won by Finnish skier Marjo Matikainen at Holmenkollen, Norway on 17 March 1988.

Calendar

Men

Women

Men's team events

Women's team events

NOTE: Races marked with a star (*) counts officially for both as "FIS World Cup" and "Olympic Winter Games" wins statistics.

Overall standings

Men's standings

Women's standings

Medal table

Achievements
First World Cup career victory

Men
None

Women
  Tamara Tikhonova, 23, in her 5th season – the WC 2 (10 km F) in Bohinj; also first podium 
  Simone Greiner-Petter, 20, in her 2nd season – the WC 5 (20 km F) in Toblach; first podium was 1987–88 WC 1 (5 km F) in La Clusaz
  Vida Vencienė, 26, in her 3rd season – the WC 6 (10 km C) in Calgary; first podium was 1987–88 WC 4 (10 km C) in Leningrad

Victories in this World Cup (all-time number of victories as of 1987/88 season in parentheses)

Men
 , 3 (6) first places
 , 2 (20) first places
 , 2 (3) first places
 , 1 (3) first place
 , 1 (2) first place
 , 1 (2) first place
 , 1 (2) first place

Women
 , 2 (7) first places
 , 2 (2) first places
 , 1 (8) first places
 , 1 (3) first place
 , 1 (2) first place
 , 1 (2) first place
 , 1 (1) first place
 , 1 (1) first place

References

FIS Cross-Country World Cup seasons
World Cup 1987-88
World Cup 1987-88